Juuso Hämäläinen (born 8 December 1993) is a Finnish professional footballer who plays for Inter Turku, as a defender.

Career

Back to Inter Turku
On 27 November 2018, Inter Turku announced that they had signed with Hämäläinen for the 2019 season.

References

1993 births
Living people
Finnish footballers
FC Inter Turku players
Rovaniemen Palloseura players
Veikkausliiga players
Association football defenders